Pejaten Village is a shopping and entertainment center with a family allotment located on Jalan Warung Jati Barat, Jati Padang, Pasar Minggu, Jakarta in Indonesia. It was built in 1991 as Pejaten Mall , but since 2007 the management as well as the name was changed.

History
Pejaten Mall was established in 1991 and is managed by Kentjana Widjaja and Pacific Star Properties Ltd. The tenant shop were Rimo Department of Commerce, TOPS Supermarket, Mega 21 , and a food-court area named MEGABITEZ . Over time, tenants then changed from Rimo and TOPS to Matahari Department Store and Hypermart.

In 2008 all of its shares were held by Lippo Group through LMIR-Trust, and became one of the malls in the portfolio of PT Lippo Karawaci Tbk.  Pejaten Mall began to change its image, and changed its name to Pejaten Village. The entire building underwent a change in face shape. Pejaten Village has 6 floors of shopping centers and 2 basements with a total NLA of 56,000 square meters. Construction began in 2007, and was completed in 2008. Two previous tenants who still survive are Matahari Department Store and Hypermart, while the Cineplex also under went a change of face and image to become Pejaten Village XXI. Some of the tenants who are now there include Kemiri (dining area), Fitness First,  Gramedia, Electronic Solution, Waka-Waka Games, Sarinah, Inul Vista,  Batik Keris and Sport Station.
On November 13, 2018, a fire was broken out in the mall and adjacent area.

See also

List of shopping malls in Indonesia

References

Shopping malls in Jakarta
Post-independence architecture of Indonesia
South Jakarta